Khaste Lake is a freshwater lake located at the Kharane Phant in Pokhara metropolitan city, Nepal. The lake is located in Lekhnath ward numbers 3, 4 and 6.

Geography 

Fauna 
Pisciculture has  been practiced in this lake for several years. 

The area known as Bird Wetland is best suited as a bird watching on the lake.  Siberian, Indian and Afghani birds come here to find refuge from the cold. 

Yellow bittern, a summer migratory bird species has been observed near the lake. 

Area has potential to become research center for migratory birds of different species.

References

Lakes of Gandaki Province
Kaski District
Geography of Pokhara